Diploma is the third studio album by Filipino rapper Gloc-9. It has 14 tracks and was released under Musiko Records & Sony BMG Music Entertainment (Philippines), Inc. in 2007.

Track listing and durations
All tracks written by Aristotle Pollisco, except where noted. All tracks produced by Gloc-9.

Bonus tracks

Sample credits:

 "B.I" heavily samples and uses the melody of "E.I." performed by Nelly and written by Cornell Haynes and Jason Lee Epperson.
 "Torpedo" is a remixed version of the original song of the same name by Eraserheads, from their 1995 album Cutterpillow.

Reference

External links
 Titik Pilipino: The Online Resource for Filipino Songs

2007 albums
Gloc-9 albums